Lewis Jacobs (1904 – February 11, 1997) was an American screenwriter, film director and critic. He authored several books, including The Rise of the American Film.

Early life
Jacobs was born in 1904 in Philadelphia, Pennsylvania. He graduated from the Pennsylvania Academy of the Fine Arts.

Career
Jacobs began his career as a screenwriter for Metro-Goldwyn-Mayer and Columbia Pictures in Hollywood. He moved to New York, where he directed several experimental short films modeled after the Soviet social and political cinema and he was fond of and drew inspirations from the likes of Dziga Vertov and Hans Richter.

In 1930, Jacobs founded the magazine Experimental Cinema, which was one of the first publications to view film as art. He spent time with noted early pioneers such as Sergei Eisenstein. He lived in Hollywood gaining acclaim as a film scholar, taking jobs such as advising and working on a draft with Orson Welles on his first feature film Citizen Kane and directing Elizabeth Taylor in her first screen tests for the film National Velvet.

After spending many years in Hollywood as a contract studio writer, he moved to New York in the late 1940s during the period of the blacklist and joined the Workers Film and Photo League as well as doing work for film trailers.  In 1933 he compiled all the footage he had made during his lunch breaks and put it into the film Footnote to Fact, which was intended to be part one in a four-part documentary titled As I Walk, a look into the depths of poverty during the Great Depression in NYC.  The final three parts were never completed and the original negative was believed lost until it was rediscovered by the Anthology Film Archives in 1990.  The film is now available in the Unseen Cinema: Early American Avant Garde Film 1894-1941 DVD box-set, under the volume entitled "Picturing a Metropolis".

Jacobs authored numerous books on cinema, taught film courses at universities, and juried many film festivals including the Venice Film Festival. In 1967, he wrote the screenplay for the film Sweet Love, Bitter (1967), which went on to become the inspiration for Clint Eastwood's Bird.

Death
Jacobs died on February 11, 1997, in Manhasset, New York, at age 93.

Bibliography
 The Rise of the American Film: A Critical History With an Essay
 The Emergence of Film Art
 Introduction to the Art of the Movies: An Anthology of Ideas on the Nature
 The Movies as Medium
 The Documentary Tradition

References

1904 births
1997 deaths
People from Philadelphia
Pennsylvania Academy of the Fine Arts alumni
American film directors
American film historians
20th-century American historians
20th-century American male writers
American male non-fiction writers